The 2016 AFC Champions League was the 35th edition of Asia's premier club football tournament organized by the Asian Football Confederation (AFC), and the 14th under the current AFC Champions League title.

Jeonbuk Hyundai Motors defeated Al-Ain in the final to win their second AFC Champions League title, and qualified as the AFC representative at the 2016 FIFA Club World Cup in Japan, their second appearance in the FIFA Club World Cup. Guangzhou Evergrande were the defending champions, but were eliminated in the group stage.

Association team allocation
The AFC Competitions Committee proposed a revamp of the AFC club competitions on 25 January 2014, which was ratified by the AFC Executive Committee on 16 April 2014. The 46 AFC member associations (excluding the associate member Northern Mariana Islands) are ranked based on their national team's and clubs' performance over the last four years in AFC competitions, with the allocation of slots for the 2015 and 2016 editions of the AFC club competitions determined by the 2014 rankings:
The associations are split into West Zone and East Zone, with 23 associations in each zone:
West Zone consists of the associations from West Asia, Central Asia, South Asia, except India and Maldives
East Zone consists of the associations from ASEAN and East Asia, plus India and Maldives
In each zone, there are a total of 12 direct slots in the group stage, with the 4 remaining slots filled through play-offs.
The top 12 associations in each zone as per the AFC rankings are eligible to enter the AFC Champions League, as long as they fulfill the AFC Champions League criteria.
The top six associations in each zone get at least one direct slot in the group stage, while the remaining associations get only play-off slots:
The associations ranked 1st and 2nd each get three direct slots and one play-off slot (in play-off round).
The associations ranked 3rd and 4th each get two direct slots and two play-off slots (one in play-off round, one in preliminary round 2).
The associations ranked 5th each get one direct slot and two play-off slots (both in preliminary round 2).
The associations ranked 6th each get one direct slot and one play-off slot (in preliminary round 2).
The associations ranked 7th to 12th each get one play-off slot (in preliminary round 1).
The maximum number of slots for each association is one-third of the total number of clubs in the top division (e.g., Australia can only get a maximum of three total slots as there are only nine Australia-based clubs in the A-League).

The AFC Competitions Committee finalised the slot allocation for the 2015 and 2016 editions of the AFC Champions League based on the criteria, including the AFC rankings and the implementation of club licensing regulations, on 28 November 2014.

The following table shows the slot allocation for the 2016 AFC Champions League, which are adjusted accordingly since some of the slots are unused.

Notes

Teams
The following 45 teams from 17 associations entered the competition.

In the following table, the number of appearances and last appearance count only those since the 2002–03 season (including qualifying rounds), when the competition was rebranded as the AFC Champions League. TH means title holders.

Notes

Schedule
The schedule of the competition is as follows (all draws are held in Kuala Lumpur, Malaysia).

Qualifying play-off

Preliminary round 1

Preliminary round 2

Play-off round

Group stage

Group A

Group B

Group C

Group D

Group E

Group F

Group G

Group H

Knockout stage

Bracket

Round of 16

Quarter-finals

Notes

Semi-finals

Final

Awards

Main awards

All-Star Squad
Source:

Opta Best XI
Source:

Top scorers

Controversies

On 25 January 2016, the AFC announced changes to the group stage schedule due to Saudi Arabia's refusal to play in Iran. After the changes, all matches between teams from Iran and Saudi Arabia (including possible play-off winners) were rescheduled to be played on matchdays 5 and 6 (19–20 April and 3–4 May). The venues of these matches would be decided after an evaluation deadline of 15 March 2016. As there had not been a return to normal relations between the two countries by then with Saudi Arabia refusing to lift their travel restrictions to Iran, the AFC accepted the Saudi Arabian Football Federation's proposal of playing all matches between teams from Iran and Saudi Arabia in neutral venues. The Saudi Arabian Football Federation supports its clubs who refuse to travel to Iran. The Iranian Football Federation has stated that it could withdraw from the AFC Champions League due to the venue changes.

See also
2016 AFC Cup
2016 FIFA Club World Cup

References

External links
AFC Champions League, the-AFC.com

 
1
2016